Alipurduars may refer to:

 Alipurduars (Lok Sabha constituency)
 Alipurduars (Vidhan Sabha constituency)